Haldun Boysan (6 July 1958 – 31 August 2020) was a Turkish actor. One of his most notable works was in Valley of the Wolves as Tombalacı Mehmet.

Death 
Boysan died of heart attack on 31 August 2020 in his hotel room in Ürgüp district of Nevşehir at age of 62, during his stay in the city for the shooting of Maria ile Mustafa. He was buried at Karşıyaka Cemetery in Ankara.

Selected filmography

References

External links
 

1958 births
2020 deaths
People from Ankara
Turkish male film actors
Turkish male television actors
Burials at Karşıyaka Cemetery, Ankara